Elachista mutarata is a moth of the family Elachistidae. It is found in the Australian Capital Territory.

The forewings are basally blue and pale brown. The hindwings are dark grey.

The larvae feed on Carex appressa. They mine the leaves of their host plant. The frass is deposited in a dense block in the upper part of the mine. The larvae may leave the mine to start a new mine on the same or another leaf. Pupation takes place outside of the mine, along the midrib of a leaf of the host plant.

References

Moths described in 2011
Endemic fauna of Australia
mutarata
Moths of Australia
Taxa named by Lauri Kaila